The Hășdate (also: Hăjdate) is a small river in the Apuseni Mountains, Cluj County, western Romania. It is a left tributary of the river Arieș. It flows through the municipalities Săvădisla, Ciurila and Petreștii de Jos, and joins the Arieș at Corneşti, near Turda. It formed the Cheile Turzii, a narrow river gorge.

Tributaries
The following rivers are tributaries to the river Hășdate (from source to mouth):

Left: Sălicea, Săliște, Micuș, Negoteasa 
Right: Filea, Livada, Petridul

References

Rivers of Romania
Rivers of Cluj County